ACM Student Chapter is the international Association for Computing Machinery's student society which provides opportunities to students for networking, learn together and share their knowledge. Its main focus is on building and developing members' passion for computer science.

History
The first student chapter was founded in 1961 at the University of Louisiana at Lafayette. ACM is currently organized into over hundreds of local chapters over 800 colleges and universities throughout the world.

Membership
The members of chapters are eligible for various benefits such as coding competitions, technical talks and mentoring sessions by experienced professionals.

Notable chapters
 ACM student chapter of University of California, Los Angeles
 ACM student chapter of University of Washington
 ACM student chapter of University of Louisiana at Lafayette
 ACM student chapter of University of Pittsburgh

References

External links
 Homepage

Association for Computing Machinery
Student organizations established in 1961